Air-to-air can refer to:

 Air-to-air combat
 Air-to-air missile
 Air-to-air photography
 Air-to-air refueling
 Air-to-air rocket
 Air-to-air refrigeration

See also

 anti-aircraft and 'anti-air' (adj.)
 
 Air (disambiguation)
 AA (disambiguation)